The Gutenberg-Gymnasium Erfurt is a gymnasium (secondary school) located in Erfurt, Germany. It opened in 1991 and has approximately 750 students between the ages of 10 and 19.

History 
 The Gutenberg-Gymnasium was formed from the earlier "Gutenberg School" which was built in 1908. Before the German reunification the Art Nouveau building housed a Polytechnic Secondary School.
 In 2001 the school celebrated its tenth anniversary with a series of events such as dances.
 It shares a twin-school relationship with two other schools, one in Mainz and the other with Bowling Green High School in Kentucky, United States.

Massacre 

On April 26, 2002, 19-year-old Robert Steinhäuser, a recently expelled student, brought two firearms to school and moved from classroom to classroom shooting teachers, and altogether killed 13 teachers and 2 students. When police arrived on the scene, he shot an officer in the head, killing him instantly. He was then locked in a room by a teacher, where he committed suicide. Subsequent to these events, the school was closed for renovations and officially re-opened more than three years later on August 29, 2005. German chancellor Gerhard Schröder spoke at the ceremony.

External links 

  Official school website

Gymnasiums in Germany
Educational institutions established in 1991
Johannes Gutenberg
1991 establishments in Germany